Sanima may refer to:
 Sanima people, an ethnic group of Venezuela and Brazil
 Sanima language, a language of Venezuela and Brazil
 Sanima Bank, a Nepalese bank

Language and nationality disambiguation pages